The 2016 Washington wildfires season were a series of wildfires in the U.S. state of Washington, notable because of brush fires near the Hanford Nuclear Reservation, and because of brush fires near Spokane, Washington.

During the summer of 2016 (in July and August particularly during the Range 12 fire), there was grave concern about the fires in eastern Washington due to the Hanford Nuclear Reservation in Benton County, Washington, and about rare and endangered species that may have been affected by the fire.
  Also of concern were the sheep and cattle killed during the fire.

Range 12 fire 
main: Range 12 fire
The fire was the third in recent years to affect the area surrounding the Hanford Reach National Monument and the Arid Lands Ecology Reserve, but was contained during the earlier days of August through the use of controlled burns.

Other fires 
In late July, two fires in eastern Yakima County and southern Grant County burned more than  before being contained.

In August, the area surrounding Spokane, the state's second largest city, was threatened with three active wildfires.

In late August, Wellesley and Yale fires merged to form the Spokane Complex Fire. Mandatory evacuations were ordered for residents in the Moccasin Bay area of Spangle. By August 22, fires in Spokane County had destroyed 10 homes.

A series of lightning strike fires in the Olympic Mountains were visible from the Seattle area and lowered air quality to "moderate" levels as rated by the Puget Sound Clean Air Agency.

On August 23, Governor Jay Inslee declared a state of emergency in 20 of Washington's 39 counties, mostly in Eastern Washington, citing limited local firefighting resources. Inslee blamed ongoing climate change for creating "explosive conditions" in the state's forests and wild lands, fueling stronger wildfires in recent years.

Another pair of lightning strike fires in the Glacier Peak Wilderness created hazy conditions over Wenatchee to the east.

List of notable fires

References

External links
Inciweb
NWCC – Northwest Fire Locations
NWCC 2016 Annual Fire Report

Wildfires in Washington (state) by year
2016 Washington (state) wildfires